Tom Brown (born 25 July 1987) is a British chef who was a finalist on the Great British Menu (2018). He now owns and is in charge of his own restaurant, Cornerstone in Hackney Wick.

Early life

Brown was born to Geoff and Janice Brown and raised in Redruth, Cornwall. 

He trained with Paul Ripley at Rick Stein's Restaurant and St. Kew Inn. In 2012 he was appointed as chef de partie at the St Enodoc Hotel, Wadebridge, Cornwall and in 2016 became a protégé of acclaimed chef Nathan Outlaw where he held the position as head chef at Outlaws restaurant.

References

External links
 Saturday Kitchen recipes
 Tom Brown - Great British Menu Finalist 2017
 Tom Brown - Great British Chefs

1987 births
British chefs
English chefs
English television chefs
Living people
Head chefs of Michelin starred restaurants